Ramchandrappa Shankar is an Indian politician who was the Minister of State for Horticulture and sericulture of Karnataka.  He was elected to the Karnataka Legislative Assembly from Ranebennur in the 2018 Karnataka Legislative Assembly election as a member of the Karnataka Pragnyavantha Janatha Party.

References

Living people
Bharatiya Janata Party politicians from Karnataka
People from Haveri district
Karnataka MLAs 2018–2023
Year of birth missing (living people)